St. James Church in South Greenough, Western Australia, was built in 1872.  It was listed as a historic building in 2010.

References

Anglican churches in Western Australia
State Register of Heritage Places in the City of Greater Geraldton
Mid West (Western Australia)